Washington's 23rd legislative district is one of forty-nine districts in Washington state for representation in the state legislature.

The district includes northern Kitsap County and Bainbridge Island.

The district's legislators are state senator Christine Rolfes and state representatives Tarra Simmons (position 1) and Drew Hansen (position 2), all Democrats.

See also
Washington Redistricting Commission
Washington State Legislature
Washington State Senate
Washington House of Representatives

References

External links
Washington State Redistricting Commission
Washington House of Representatives
Map of Legislative Districts

23